Mamilloporidae is a family of bryozoans belonging to the order Cheilostomatida.

Genera:
 Anoteropora Canu & Bassler, 1927
 Mamillopora Smitt, 1873

References

Cheilostomatida